Green Rock Branch is a  long 2nd order tributary to Cherrystone Creek in Pittsylvania County, Virginia.

Course 
Green Rock Branch rises about 1 mile south-southeast of Weal, Virginia and then flows generally east to join Cherrystone Creek in the southwestern part of Chatham.

Watershed 
Green Rock Branch drains  of area, receives about 45.7 in/year of precipitation, has a wetness index of 364.75, and is about 52% forested.

See also 
 List of Virginia Rivers

References 

Rivers of Virginia
Rivers of Pittsylvania County, Virginia
Tributaries of the Roanoke River